James L. Coker III House is a historic home located at Hartsville, Darlington County, South Carolina.  It was built in 1931, and is a two-story, three bay, brick Colonial Revival style residence. It has two-story, lateral gable wings flanked by one-story end gable wings, and a one-story sunroom.  It features an engaged portico with four slender Tuscan order columns. It was the home of James Lide Coker, III (1904-1961), prominent Hartsville manufacturer and president of Sonoco Products Company.  Also on the property is a one-story, frame, double-pen "cabin".

It was listed on the National Register of Historic Places in 1991.

References

Houses on the National Register of Historic Places in South Carolina
Colonial Revival architecture in South Carolina
Houses completed in 1931
Houses in Hartsville, South Carolina
National Register of Historic Places in Darlington County, South Carolina